NK Žminj is a Croatian football club based in a village of Žminj in the central part of Istria.

Honours 

 Treća HNL – West:
Winners (2): 1999–2000, 2002–03

Football clubs in Croatia
Istria